Fuerza Ecuador was a political party in Ecuador.

History
The party was established on 20 October 2014 by Abdalá Bucaram, Jr. as a successor to the Ecuadorian Roldosist Party, which had its legal registration withdrawn. It was registered in 2015 by the National Electoral Council after presenting 226,040 signatures.

Bucaram was the party's presidential candidate for the 2017 general elections, finishing fifth with 4.8% of the vote. The party also won a single seat in the National Assembly, taken by María Mercedes Cuesta.

On 27 November 2021, the National Electoral Council de-registered Fuerza Ecuador for not meeting the necessary percentage of votes or elected positions in two consecutive elections.

References

External links
Official website

2014 establishments in Ecuador
Political parties established in 2014
Political parties disestablished in 2021
2021 disestablishments in Ecuador
Political parties in Ecuador
Populist parties